Rahul Ramachandran is an Indian film director and scriptwriter who works in the Malayalam film industry. 
He is often known to be the youngest film director from Malayalam film industry. He is known for directing the movie Jeem Boom Bhaa starring Askar Ali, Anju Kurian, Baiju Santhosh and Neha Saxena.
His second movie is Njan Kanda Superman, which was directed by Sooraj Shivaprasad starring Askar Ali for which he has worked as the script writer.

Career
Ramachandran started his career in 2017 as a director for the short film Chin sin si starring Disney James and in 2018 he did a short film for Club FM named Neeyum Njanum Avanum starring RJ Musafir, RJ Maheen and RJ Vaishakh which went viral in the social media. In 2019 he did a short film named "ADAM" starring Kannan Nayar which got official selection for International Documentary and Short Film Festival of Kerala. Later in 2019, he has written and directed the movie Jeem Boom Bhaa and then scripted Njan Kanda Superman and further announced the movie project named SG 251 with prominent actor Suresh Gopi.

Personal Life
Rahul Ramachandran got officially engaged to actress Sreevidya Mullachery on January 22 2023.

Filmography

Feature films 
 As director

 As Script Writer

Short films

Awards and recognition 
 Adam - Official selection for IDSFFK.

References

External links

Year of birth missing (living people)
Date of birth unknown
Living people
Film directors from Kerala
Malayalam film directors
Malayalam screenwriters
Screenwriters from Kerala